Wien Weidlingau is a railway station serving Penzing, the fourteenth district of Vienna.

References 

Railway stations in Vienna